Salinimicrobium marinum is a heterotrophic and facultatively anaerobic bacterium from the genus of Salinimicrobium.

References

Flavobacteria
Bacteria described in 2010